Xiao is a Chinese-language surname. In the Wade-Giles system of romanization, it is rendered as Hsiao, which is commonly used in Taiwan. It is also romanized as Siauw, Shiao, Sjauw, Siaw, Siew, Siow, Seow, Siu, Shiu or Sui, as well as "Shaw" in less common situations, inspired by the transliteration of the surname of notable figures such as Irish playwright George Bernard Shaw and English actor Robert Shaw. It is the 99th name on the Hundred Family Surnames poem.

After the demise of the Qing dynasty, some of the descendants of Manchu clan Šumuru sinicized their clan name to the Chinese surnames Shu (舒), Xu (徐) or Xiao (蕭).

A 1977 study found that it was the 20th most common Chinese surname in the world. It is said to be the 30th most common in China.  In 2019 it was the 33rd most common surname in Mainland China.

History

Han Chinese surname
The Xiao surname originated from Xiao County in Anhui province, China. In the state of Song during the Spring and Autumn period of ancient China, the nobleman Daxin (蕭叔大心) was enfeoffed at Xiao, which became an attached state of Song. The people of Xiao later adopted the name of their state as their surname. Centuries later, Xiao He was the first prime minister of the Han dynasty. Later on, his descendant Xiao Biao (萧彪) moved to Lanling (兰陵), now Yicheng in Shandong province, due to political problems during the reign of Emperor Wu of Han. The Xiao people therefore also trace their origin to Lanling, and sometimes they are called Lanling Xiao (“兰陵萧”).

Another mass movement of Xiao people came during the Disaster of Yongjia at the end of the Western Jin dynasty, when Xiao Zheng (萧整) moved to Danyang, Jiangsu. It was also called South Lanling (南兰陵). The descendants of Danyang Xiao (丹阳萧氏) later founded two dynasties: Xiao Daocheng was the founding emperor of the Southern Qi dynasty, and Xiao Yan founded the Liang dynasty.

During the Tang dynasty, there were nine Xiao family members appointed as chancellors (or prime ministers), the continuous eight chancellors (八叶传芳, "八叶世家"). The first was Xiao Yu (萧瑀), followed by the other eight Xiao families:
his great grand nephew Xiao Song(萧嵩)
Xiao Song's eldest son Xiao Hua (萧华)
Xiao Hua's nephew Xiao Fu (萧復)
Xiao Hua's grandson Xiao Fu (萧俯, written with a different character for Fu)
Xiao Fu's grandson Xiao Zhen (萧真)
Xiao Hua's grandson Xiao Fang (萧仿)
Xiao Fang's son Xiao Gou (萧遘).
There were altogether nine chancellors from the Xiao family during the Tang dynasty.

The Jiang family (江氏) from Jiangwan (江湾), Wuyuan, Jiangxi was originally surnamed Xiao and they call themselves the Xiao–Jiang family (萧江氏). The Xiao-Jiang family was from Danyang (丹阳 (南兰陵) 东城里萧氏). When the Later Liang dynasty overthrew the Tang dynasty in 907, the Tang general Xiao Zhen (萧桢) led a revolt against the Later Liang dynasty but failed. Xiao Zhen was the second son of the Tang chancellor Xiao Gou. The Xiao family left Danyang and escaped to the south. They changed their surname to Jiang; Xiao Zhen (萧桢) became Jiang Zhen (江桢) and he was the progenitor of the Xiao–Jiang family. They later moved to Yunwan (云湾, which changed the name to Jiangwan 江湾). This means that the Jiang family from this area is actually also part of the Xiao family, they are known as the Xiao-Jiang family. Former CPC General Secretary Jiang Zemin is a member of the Xiao-Jiang family.

During the Southern Song dynasty, Xiao Guoliang (萧国梁) was the first member of the Xiao family in Zhangzhou, Fujian province. His grandson, Xiao Xun (萧洵) became the county magistrate of Chaoyang in Guangdong province. He became the founder of the Xiao family of Chaoyang. During this period, some members of the Xiao family moved across the sea to Taiwan.

Khitan, Uighur and Manchu surname
During the Liao dynasty, the emperor Abaoji conferred the surname "Xiao" on two Khitan clans, the Bali and the Yishi, reportedly out of admiration for Xiao He. Abaoji's sun Yaogu further conferred the surname "Xiao" on the Uighur Shulü clan. Throughout the Liao dynasty, many empresses were surnamed "Xiao" (see list).

After the demise of the Manchu Qing dynasty, many Manchus adopted Han Chinese-style surnames. Some members of the Manchu Šumuru clan, which claims descent from the Uighur Shulü clan, adopted "Xiao" as their surname.

Later history
During the Yuan dynasty, members of the Xiao family moved from Jiangxi to Meizhou and Dabu in Guangdong province. They are mainly the Hakka Xiao family.

In the early Ming dynasty, the population in North and Central China was declining due to wars. In order to increase the population and start the economic recovery of these war-torn areas, the Ming government organized many large-scale forced mass migration to the area. People were moved from Shanxi province, which had been less affected by the wars, to the war-torn, less-populated area of North and Central China. The people were ordered to move to a location near "the tree" (大槐树), and prepare themselves for the family migration. The Shanxi Xiao family were part of this group of "immigrants under the tree" (在大槐树下集中移民), which were moved to the modern provinces of Henan, Shandong, Hebei, Beijing, Tianjin, Shaanxi, Gansu, Ningxia, Anhui, Jiangsu, Hubei, Hunan, Guangxi, Liaoning, Jilin, Heilongjiang, Shanxi and other places. Today, the Xiao family still has memorial tablets dedicated to their ancestors among the "immigrants under the tree" at the fourth cabinet of the memorial hall at the "large tree roots memorial garden" (大槐树寻根祭祖园祭祖堂四号供橱).

During the Ming dynasty, many members of the Xiao family also moved to Yunnan province. They became the first members of the Yunnan Xiao family (云南萧氏).

During the Ming and Qing dynasties, there were also mass migrations of Xiao kinspeople from Jiangxi to Sichuan, especially at the beginning of these dynasties, when two major revolutions took place. Historians have called this process of mass migration "Jiangxi filled Huguang, Huguang filled Sichuan" (江西填湖广，湖广填四川). "Huguang" refers to the provinces of Hunan and Guangdong. According to historical materials, from the beginning of the reign of the Qianlong Emperor of the Qing dynasty, many members of the Xiao family moved to Sichuan.

During the Chinese Civil War between the Communists and the Nationalists, Xiao people, especially those from Fujian, moved to Taiwan with the Nationalists. In Taiwan, they lived primarily in the cities and counties of Changhua, Chiayi, Taipei, Kaohsiung and Taoyuan. Today, Xiao is the 30th-most common surname in Taiwan.

Overseas
At the end of the Qing dynasty, Chinese started to move to other countries to work there. The Xiao also moved to other countries such as Vietnam, Thailand, Singapore, Malaysia and Indonesia. Others migrated from Fujian to Taiwan.

In Malaysia and Singapore, direct transliterations from the various Chinese dialects were used to write Chinese surnames. The Hokkien or Teochew Chinese romanized "Xiao" as "Seow". Teochew "Seow" are mainly Xiao from Chaoyang in Guangdong province. The Hakka Xiao, especially Huizhou Hakka of Titi (知知港) (in Negeri Sembilan state of Malaysia), a village with a high concentration of Hakka people surnamed Xiao, romanized "Xiao" as "Siow" or "Seow". These days, some members of younger generations use hanyu pinyin and write their surname as "Xiao".

In the United States, the surname is also, albeit less commonly, romanized as "Shaw".

Simplified Chinese forms 
The traditional surname 蕭 is currently represented by three different characters derived from traditional Chinese (蕭), simplified Chinese (萧), and the rescinded second-round simplification (肖).  Hong Kong, Malaysia and Taiwan maintain traditional Chinese characters and therefore write 蕭. In mainland China and Singapore, where simplified Chinese is used, most linguistics agree the surname should be written as 萧.  However, many people in mainland China still have 肖 as their surname in their legal documents for historical reasons (see below). In mainland China, people may regard them as two separate surnames. However, in circumstances where traditional Chinese is used, e.g. in cross-strait relations, this may lead to confusion.

People have long been writing the surname 肖 for simplicity, but the form was considered informal and not used in formal texts. However, the second-round Chinese simplification established 肖 as the standard form. When the second-round simplification was rescinded in 1984, some people restored their surname in legal documents to the traditional writing form, but some others did not.

Most other surnames do not share these problems. For example, Liao (廖) was simplified to a character with 广 and 了 combined in the second-round simplification. All Liao people reverted to using 廖 after the rescission, because the modification is no longer considered a valid character and cannot be typed into the computer. However, 肖, which has other meanings, is still valid so some people have continued to use this form including in legal documents.

Notable people surnamed Xiao

Historical figures
Xiao He, one of the most highly regarded statesmen in Chinese history and the first Prime Minister of the Han Dynasty
Emperor Wu of Liang, founder of the Liang Dynasty
Xiao Yu Official of the Sui Dynasty and Chancellor of the Tang Dynasty
Empress Xiao, various Liao dynasty empresses bearing the surname, the most prominent being Xiao Chuo

Modern times
 Anna Sui, American fashion designer.
 Elva Hsiao, Taiwanese singer
 Jam Hsiao (born 1987), Taiwanese singer, lead singer of band Lion
 Hsiao Chia-chi, Deputy Mayor of Taichung (2002-2013)
 Seow Poh Leng (1883–1942), a prominent and successful Singaporean banker, founding member of the Ho Hong Bank, member of the committee of the Straits Settlement (Settlement of Singapore), philanthropist and benefactor of public development works
 Xiao Hong, Chinese writer (1911–1942)
 Xiao Ke, General in the PLA of China
Andrew Seow, Singaporean born actor 
Hsiao Bi-khim, Taiwanese Representative to the United States and former Taiwanese legislator
Edwin Siu, Hong Kong actor and singer
William Hsiao, Xiao from Jiangxi. American economist, K.T. Li Professor of Economics at Harvard School of Public Health, Harvard University, USA. He is internationally recognized for his work in health care financing and social insurance.
Vincent Siew, former Vice President of the Republic of China (Taiwan)
Choon-Leong Seow, a Singapore-born biblical scholar and Distinguished Professor of Hebrew Bible at Vanderbilt University
Francis Seow, a Singapore-born political dissident who is in exile from Singapore after lawsuits by the former Prime Minister Lee Kwan Yew. Seow is currently a United States citizen, and a University Fellow based in the Department of Asian Studies at Harvard University.
Siu Fong Fong, Siao Liang or Josephine Siao, MBE, Hong Kong film actress, writer and psychologist, known for her work against child abuse
Siow Lee Chin, Singaporean violinist
Gaetan Siew, born in Mauritius in 1954, President of the International Union of Architects 2005–08
Jiang Zeming, former General Secretary of the Communist Party of China. He is from Xiao Jiang family.
Xiao Qiang, adjunct professor of University of California, Berkeley, USA. Founder and Editor in Chief of China Digital Times, a bilingual China news website. Full-time human right activist after the Tiananmen Square Protests of 1989. Xiao is a recipient of the MacArthur Fellowship in 2001. 
Hsiao Sa, Taiwanese author
Xiao Yang, from Heyuan, Guangdong, former President of the Supreme People's Court of China, People's Republic of China from 1998-2008, Minister of Justice 1993–98
Yum Tong Siu from Taishan, Kwangdong, mathematician, William Elwood Byerly Professor of Mathematics at Harvard University. Dr. Siu has been the dominant figure in the mathematics of several complex variables. 
Di Xiao, Chinese pianist
David Xiao, Canadian politician and current Member of the Legislative Assembly of Alberta, representing the constituency of Edmonton-McClung as a Progressive Conservative
Siauw Giok Tjhan (1914–1981), Indonesian politician, cabinet minister under Sukarno, imprisoned for 10 years by Suharto (:id:Siauw Giok Tjhan )
Felix Siauw, Indonesian Islamic cleric
Xiao Fuxing,  novelist and now the associate editor in People's Literature
Xiao Guodong, Chinese professional snooker player
Xiao Zhan, notable actor, singer and model.
Arlen Siu, singer-songwriter, essayist and Sandinista revolutionary.
Xiao Dejun, (born 1999) Singer, member of South Korean group NCT and its Chinese sub-unit WayV (威神V)
 Seow Kim Choo, Singaporean murder victim

References 

Chinese-language surnames

Individual Chinese surnames